Electronic tax filing, or e-filing, is a system for submitting tax documents to a revenue service electronically, often without the need to submit any paper documents.

Electronic tax filing may refer to:

 IRS e-file, a United States system for federal income tax
 NETFILE, a Canada Revenue Agency system for consumers
 EFILE, a Canada Revenue Agency system for professional tax preparers

See also 
 E-file (disambiguation)